The Union of Communication Workers (UCW) was a trade union in the United Kingdom for workers in the post office and telecommunications industries.

History

The union was founded in 1919 as the Union of Post Office Workers (UPW) by the merger of the Postmen's Federation, Postal and Telegraph Clerks' Association and the Fawcett Association.  It achieved official recognition, and as a result, in 1920 the London Postal Porters' Association, Central London Postmen's Association, Tracers' Association, Tube Staff Association, Messengers' Association and Sorters' Association all merged with it.  It was banned legally from TUC membership from 1927 to 1946. Its longest strike was for 7 weeks in 1971.

It changed its name in 1980, and merged with the National Communications Union in 1995 to form the Communication Workers' Union.

Election results
The union sponsored Labour Party candidates in each Parliamentary election.  From 1927 until the end of World War II, the union was legally barred from affiliating to the party, so its candidates in that period are omitted from many sources.

Leadership

General Secretaries
1919: William Bowen
1936: T. J. Hodgson
1944: Charles Geddes
1956: Ron Smith
1967: Thomas Jackson
1982: Alan Tuffin
1992: Alan Johnson

Deputy General Secretaries
1919: Walter Baker
1931: James Paterson
1941: Charles Geddes
1944: G. A. Stevens
1951: Richard Hayward
1956: L. V. Andrews
1967: Norman Stagg
1980: Alan Tuffin
1982: Tony Clarke
1993: Derek Hodgson

Treasurers
1919: Will Lockyer
1935: W. T. Leicester
1947: A. H. Wood
1953: Ron Smith
1956: E. R. Mercer
1962: Fred Moss
1981: Fred Binks
1988: Derek Walsh

See also

Edgar Hardcastle

References

External links
Catalogue of the UCW archives, held at the Modern Records Centre, University of Warwick

 
Trade unions established in 1919
Trade unions disestablished in 1995
Defunct trade unions of the United Kingdom
Communications trade unions
1919 establishments in the United Kingdom